Jaroslav Pouzar (born January 23, 1952) is a Czech former professional ice hockey forward.  He was selected in the fourth round of the 1982 NHL Entry Draft, 83rd overall, by the Edmonton Oilers. He won 2 cups with Edmonton in 1984, 1985.  He left to play in Europe in the summer of 1985.  He returned during 1987 season to win a third cup with Edmonton. Pouzar played parts of four NHL seasons with Edmonton, as well as seeing extensive playing time in Europe.

Pouzar twice represented Czechoslovakia at the Winter Olympics, in 1976 and 1980.

Awards and achievements
 3× Stanley Cup champion – 1984, 1985, 1987

Career statistics

Regular season and playoffs

International

References

External links 
 
 
 
 

1952 births
Living people
Czechoslovak ice hockey left wingers
Czech ice hockey left wingers
Olympic ice hockey players of Czechoslovakia
Olympic silver medalists for Czechoslovakia
Olympic medalists in ice hockey
Ice hockey players at the 1976 Winter Olympics
Ice hockey players at the 1980 Winter Olympics
Medalists at the 1976 Winter Olympics
Edmonton Oilers draft picks
Edmonton Oilers players
Motor České Budějovice players
Starbulls Rosenheim players
Stanley Cup champions
People from České Budějovice District
Sportspeople from the South Bohemian Region
Czechoslovak expatriate sportspeople in West Germany
Czechoslovak expatriate ice hockey people
Czechoslovak expatriate sportspeople in Canada
Expatriate ice hockey players in Canada
Expatriate ice hockey players in West Germany
Czechoslovak expatriate sportspeople in Germany
Expatriate ice hockey players in Germany